is a Japanese light novel series written by Ao Jūmonji and illustrated by Eiri Shirai. The story follows a group of people who suddenly find themselves in a fantasy world with no memories from before their arrival, and chronicles their struggles to survive and make a life for themselves as volunteer soldiers.

Mutsumi Okubashi began serializing a manga adaptation in Gangan Joker in 2015. The novels were adapted into a 12-episode anime television series that ran from January to March 2016. An original video animation was released in March 2016. The anime is licensed in North America by Funimation as Grimgar, Ashes and Illusions, while J-Novel Club has acquired the rights to publish the original novels in English and Yen Press published the manga adaptation.

Plot
The story begins by showing a group of novice adventurers battling goblins in a forest. The party seems utterly out of their element and is forced to flee. It is revealed through a flashback that the party, which likely originates from modern Earth, awoke with a large group of people on this world just a few weeks ago.

With no memory of how they arrived and no other options they are quickly pressed into service as Trainee Volunteer Soldiers by a mysterious individual named Chief Britney. Some take to this better than others. The lead party is composed of the leftover individuals who did not.

Led by a man named Manato they have banded together, joined class guilds, and begun hunting weak monsters as a way to grow stronger and earn the money they need to survive. Initially things do not go well. Eventually, the party learns to work as a unit and experiences enough success hunting goblins to move from the forest to a ruined city. There, Manato dies saving them from ambush and leaves the responsibility for the group to the thief, Haruhiro.

Thrown into despair, the party is fractured and grieves for their lost friend, never having realized just how much Manato did to hold them all together. Once the party comes to terms with their loss, they take in a new Priest named Merry.

Merry is initially distant and broken from the loss of her own party, for which she blames herself, but gradually comes to regard Haruhiro and the party as friends though she remains distant. Back to full strength the party seeks to avenge Manato by striking at the heart of the goblin encampment in the ruins. After slaying the goblin king the party finds closure and decides to help Merry do the same by moving their monster hunting to the kobold-infested mines where her old party fell.

The season ends with Mary's past behind her and the surviving heroes coming to terms with the life and death nature of their time on the world of Grimgar.

Characters

Main characters

 

The thief of the group. Haruhiro is generally helpful and always willing to help out his party members. He is later forced to become the group's leader after Manato's death. Eventually he starts to pay more attention to his teammates' feelings, slowly improving as leader.
 

The dark knight of the group. He is brash, impulsive, and somewhat perverted, which leads him to constantly arguing with Haruhiro. Ranta is the troublemaker of the group constantly causing problems and making rash decisions for he has a slight hint of arrogance in his character. He is also the darkest at heart, repeatedly leaving the group to follow his own ambitions, though he also develops feelings for Yume.
 

Manato chose to become a Priest and ultimately assumed the role of the group's initial leader. He saw the positives in people and with that he was able to effectively strategize battle plans when the group began hunting goblins for the first time. As they progressed as a team, they began mapping out abandoned towns while hunting bigger goblin parties. However, while resting the group was ambushed by more goblins than they were accustomed to. Effectively moving his party to retreat, a goblin archer was able to successfully hit Manato square in the back as they ran away successfully. He died soon after. In a conversation after his death, Haruhiro mentioned that aside from missing his leadership and strategist plans, Manato was also a defensive tank like Moguzo and a front line attacker like Ranta.
 

Moguzo is the tallest and heaviest member of the group and hence chose to become a member of the Warrior guild. He wears the most ironclad armor and wields a wide blade broadsword that comes up to shoulder height. Although he is the most physically imposing, he challenges Shihoru for being the most soft spoken. On several occasions he will allow his friends to sleep in and will take their turn at cooking breakfast in the morning. He somewhat remembers doing this before and finding joy out of it. He also would carve wooden figurines of noteworthy quality in his spare time. Moguzo is eventually killed by exhaustion, and replaced by Kuzaku.
 

Brave and energetic, Yume is the Hunter of the group. She sees the rest of the group as family, and has a tendency to try and protect Shihoru because of her shy and timid nature. She later leaves the group for a six-month period to train.
 

The Mage of the group. She is shy, mainly opening up to Yume and, to an extent, Manato, whom she had feelings for. She also has an inferiority complex about herself, but gains confidence as the series goes on.

Joining shortly after Manato's death, Mary effectively replaces him as the Priest of the party. Initially, there is a lot of friction between Mary and the rest of the team, due to Manato's irreplaceability and Mary's seemingly uncaring personality. She was actually a lot like Manato, but after a tragic incident that led to the death of some of her friends, she became cold and aloof. However, after Haruhiro tells her about their own situation, she slowly opens to her new party. She calls Haruhiro by the nickname "Haru" ("Hiro" in the English anime dub due to Yume already calling him Haru), and the two eventually fall in love with each other.

The Paladin of the group who joins later, replacing Moguzo.

Supporting characters
 

A volunteer soldier who arrived at the same time as Haruhiro and the others, but graduated from his position as a trainee much sooner.

Supports Renji. He has brown hair with grey sides, and wears brown and metallic armor.
 

Supports Renji. He has dark hair and wears glasses. He wears a black robe with red trim and gold cuffs.

Supports Renji. She has long brown hair and a short brown dress and high boots.

Supports Renji. A petite girl with short blue hair, blue and white dress, and brown boots. She does not have a voice actress listed.

Leader of Team Orion and an acquaintance of Mary.

Supports Team Orion and Shinohara. Formerly supported Team Michiki and a friend of Mary.

Leader of Team Michiki. Became an undead following an unsuccessful battle against the savage kobold Death Spots.

Supports Michiki. Became an undead following an unsuccessful battle against the savage kobold Death Spots.

Supports Michiki. Became an undead following an unsuccessful battle against the savage kobold Death Spots.
 

A carefree man from Tokimune's team who introduced Mary to Haruhiro's team. He has messy brown hair, and wears a green and white robe that covers his brown outfit.
 

The Commanding Officer of Red Moon, which is Alterna Frontier Army's Reserve Force. Britney has short red hair with a purple streak, and wears a white vest and shorts, and black boots.
 

Haruhiro's Thief master. Barbara has short brown hair and wears glasses. She wears an outfit that has a brown band around her breasts and green shorts, and is outfitted with belts around her waist and legs to hold knives.

Manato's Priest master. Hōnen is a balding man with long white sideburns and beard. He wears a white robe with blue trim and gold vestment, and wields a staff.

Media

Light novel
The light novels are written by Ao Jūmonji and illustrated by Eiri Shirai, and are published by Overlap. The first volume was published in 2013. Online English light novel publisher J-Novel Club announced their acquisition of the series on October 28, 2016, and Seven Seas Entertainment publishes a print version as part of their collaboration with J-Novel Club.

Volume list

Manga
A manga adaptation by Mutsumi Okubashi began serialization in Square Enix's magazine Gangan Joker on 22 April 2015. North American publisher Yen Press announced their acquisition of the manga on 23 November 2016.

Volumes

Anime
An anime television series was written and directed by Ryosuke Nakamura and produced by A-1 Pictures. Mieko Hosoi acted as character designer. Both the opening theme song, "Knew day", and the ending theme, "Harvest", were performed by (K)NoW_NAME. The series was broadcast on AT-X, Tokyo MX, Nippon BS Broadcasting, and the Asahi Broadcasting Corporation from 11 January 2016 to 28 March 2016. Funimation acquired the rights to simulcast the series with an English dub in North America. The anime is listed with 6 Blu-ray and DVD volumes containing 2 episodes each, having a total of 12 episodes. Anime Limited will release the series in the UK.

A 10-minute original video animation numbered "episode 2.5" was bundled with the first Blu-ray and DVD volume of the anime, which was released on 16 March 2016. Toho streamed a promotional video for the OVA on 5 February 2016.

Episode list

Explanatory notes

References

External links
  at Square Enix 
  
  (author) at Overlap 
 

2013 Japanese novels
A-1 Pictures
Anime and manga based on light novels
Crunchyroll anime
Dark fantasy anime and manga
Gangan Comics manga
Isekai anime and manga
Isekai novels and light novels
J-Novel Club books
Light novels
Overlap Bunko
Seven Seas Entertainment titles
Shōnen manga
Toho Animation
Yen Press titles